The pied tamarin (Saguinus bicolor), sometimes referred to as the Brazilian bare-faced tamarin, is a Critically Endangered primate species found in a restricted area of the Brazilian Amazon Rainforest. It was named the mascot of Manaus, Brazil in 2005. The species is endangered due to the increasing size of the city of Manaus which is encroaching on their native habitat.

Distribution and habitat 
A New World monkey, it is found at the city limits of Manaus, the capital of the Amazonas state of Brazil and up to 35 km to the north and 100 km to the east. The main distribution is in the rio Cuieiras and rio Preto da Eva interfluvium. Pied tamarins are also found in the adjacent rio Preto da Eva and rio Urubu interfluvium, but are comparatively rare. There appears to be interspecific competition between the pied tamarin and the red-handed tamarin with the red-handed tamarin gradually displacing the pied tamarin from areas of its historical distribution. Therefore there are multiple threats to the long-term survival of the pied tamarin that stem from habitat destruction and from interspecific competition.

The pied tamarin is found in old-growth forests, sand forest and smaller secondary forest fragments. Their density is higher in secondary forest fragments than in primary forest.

Description 
The pied tamarin's body measures 20.8–28.3 cm.; including the tail it measures 33.5–42.0 cm. The tamarin has a brown lower body and a fluffy white upper body. Their face is black and hairless, the reason for its nickname: the Brazilian bare-faced tamarin.

The pied tamarin does not have nails, but instead has claws that they adapted in order to quickly scale trees in order to retrieve food or escape predators. These nails also allow the tamarin to dig into tree bark and extract sap which they then eat.

Males weigh 428 grams (n = 4). Its life expectancy is approximately 10 years in the wild.

Behavior and reproduction

Group Life 
Individuals live in groups of 2 to 15 members with little intra-group competition. Average group size in the Reserva Florestal Adolpho Ducke is 4.8 individuals per group (n = 41), and other areas around Manaus reported mean group sizes of 6.19 ± 2.62 (n = 46). A tamarin group has a home range of 10-100 ha.

Tamarins are unlike most other mammals in the sense that the females are considered to be the dominant gender. In each group of individuals only one female is selected to breed and reproduce children. This individual is called the "Alpha Female" and reproduction by other females of the group is behaviorally suppressed. The gestation lasts 140–170 days and mothers typically give birth to twins. Although they generally give birth to twins the fact that only one female per group can produce offspring is a major cause in their reduced population size. Young tamarins are cared for primarily by the father and turned over to the mother only to nurse; however, the entire group helps with the care of the younglings that the alpha female birthed.

Diet 
Tamarins are omnivorous, their diet consisting of fruit, flowers, nectar, insects, spiders, small vertebrates and bird eggs. Its natural predators are small cats, birds of prey, and snakes. In urban settings like Manaus, the main predators are domestic and feral cats and dogs. Because of the destruction of its natural habitat, the species is at risk which is why the species has landed on the IUCN red list for endangered species as well as the top 25 most endangered primates list in Brazil.

Conservation

Classification 
As of 2015, the pied tamarin is rated critically endangered by the IUCN Red List. The pied tamarin's population is expected to decline 80% by 2033 due to anthropogenic threats, competition with golden-handed tamarin (Saguinus midas) and disease. Within the Manaus area, pied tamarins are threatened by domestic and feral cats and dogs, electrocution from power lines, and the pet trade. Additionally, rural settlement and increasing livestock agriculture continue to encroach upon and degrade the pied tamarin's remaining habitat.

Protection 
The pied tamarin is protected in some parts of its range, such as in Sumaúma State Park (52 ha), Adolfo Ducke Forest Reserve (18,240 ha) and less than half of Puranga Conquista Sustainable Development Reserve (157,807 ha). The Centro de Instrução de Guerra na Selva (CIGS)(115,000 ha) is an important protected area for the species, however it is not a conservation area but a military jungle training facility and so the area's status is uncertain. This organism is endangered due to its severe threat of species encroaching on its habitat and this will cause various issues to the ecosystem and environment.

Both European and American zoos and conservation services have pitched in financially to help out in saving the pied tamarin species. While there are only two areas in the world that are protected for the tamarins, and both are under 50 hectares, the conservation efforts have allowed for the reforestation of these places and the slow and uncertain return of the tamarins native habitat.

There is an established captive breeding program for the pied tamarin and an official studbook. As of 2009, there are 172 pied tamarins in captivity and all are registered property of the Brazilian government. Unfortunately for the tamarins, their captive breeding success rate is limited and thus it is difficult to resurrect the population artificially.

Endangerment

Causes 
The tamarins live nearby the rapidly growing city of Manaus, and as the city's area increases in size, the tamarins habitat disappears. When they can avoid the busy automobile traffic and the electric power lines, the pied tamarin reside in the small sections of forest that still remain in Manaus.

Environmental Impact 
Being an omnivore, the pied tamarins diet consists highly of plants. They pick up plant seeds when they eat and disperse them around their environment, thus bolstering their ecosystem. They also dine on small animals, which keeps the insect and amphibian populations in check. With the declining tamarin population, the issue becomes bigger than just the primates, but now turns into an ecosystem issue. There is no way to know for certain how the loss of the pied tamarin population will affect the Amazonian ecosystem, but there almost undoubtedly will be effects.

References

pied tamarin
Mammals of Brazil
Endemic fauna of Brazil
pied tamarin
Taxa named by Johann Baptist von Spix